Emmanuel Boleslaus Ledvina (October 28, 1868 – December 15, 1952) was an American prelate of the Roman Catholic Church. He served as bishop of the Diocese of Corpus Christi  in Texas from 1921 to 1949.

Biography

Early life 
Emmanuel Ledvina was born on October 28, 1868, in Evansville, Indiana, to George Emmanuel and Mary (née Kiefer) Ledvina. His father was a native of Bohemia, and worked as an architect and construction engineer. After attending parochial schools in Evansville and St. Louis, Missouri, Emmanuel Ledvina returned to Indiana and entered St. Meinrad's College in 1883. 

Ledvina was ordained to the priesthood for the Diocese of Indianapolis by Bishop Silas Chatard on March 18, 1893. Ledvina then served as a curate at Holy Trinity Parish in Evansville and afterwards at St. John's Pro-Cathedral in Indianapolis. From 1895 to 1907, he was pastor of St. Joseph's Parish in Princeton, Indiana. Ledvina became vice-president and general secretary of the Catholic Church Extension Society in 1907. He was later named a domestic prelate in 1918, and an honorary canon of the Basilica of Our Lady of Guadalupe in Mexico City in 1919.

Bishop of Corpus Christi 
On April 30, 1921, Ledvina was appointed the second bishop of the Diocese of Corpus Christi by Pope Benedict XV. He received his episcopal consecration on June 14, 1921, from Bishop Joseph Chartrand, with Bishops Cornelius Van de Ven and Joseph Lynch serving as co-consecrators. He was installed at Corpus Christi on July 12, 1921. 

During his tenure, Ledvina increased the number of priests from 32 to 160, and erected over 50 churches, 53 mission chapels, and 47 rectories. He was named an assistant at the pontifical throne in 1931. He constructed Corpus Christi Cathedral in 1940, and a chancery office in 1947. He invited the Benedictine monks of Subiaco Abbey to establish a community in the diocese and staff a new high school. He also became known for his efforts among Mexican-American Catholics in South Texas and for his opposition to the Ku Klux Klan.

On March 15, 1949, Pope Pius XII accepted Ledvina's resignation as bishop of Corpus Christi for health reasons and appointed him as titular bishop of Pitanae. Emmanuel Ledvina died on December 15, 1952, at age 84. He is buried in a crypt under the main altar of Corpus Christi Cathedral.

References

External links
Roman Catholic Diocese of Corpus Christi

Episcopal succession

1868 births
1952 deaths
20th-century Roman Catholic bishops in the United States
People from Corpus Christi, Texas
People from Evansville, Indiana
Roman Catholic Archdiocese of Indianapolis
Religious leaders from Indiana
Catholics from Texas
Catholics from Indiana